Dewes is a surname. Notable people with the surname include:

Albert Dewes (1860–1892), New Zealand cricketer
Francis Dewes (1845–1922) German-American brewer
Graham Dewes (born 1982), Fijian rugby union player
John Dewes (1926–2015), English cricketer

See also
Dews